Canal 9 is a Nicaraguan terrestrial television channel broadcasting since 2011 from the city of Managua and owned by Digital Media de Nicaragua S.A., itself a part of the larger Grupo RATENSA.

History 
The achievement of a supposed agreement between president Daniel Ortega and Mexican businessman Ángel González in 2007 for him to hand over Canal 4 practically free of charge, had led the telecommunications regulator (Telcor) to deliver a frequency that was assigned to be used exclusively by the State, which would offer public television. The frequency belonged to Canal 9, assigned to Digital Media de Nicaragua S.A., whose legal representative in 2011 was Alberto Leopoldo Mendoza D'Arcy.

Ángel González was behind its setup, who in just like most of his businesses, did not appear in his companies, using figureheads for them.

Canal 9 was supposed to be a relayer of Canal 6, the country's de facto public channel, but at the time of the deal (June 2011), the channel was still inoperational as it shut down during the Arnoldo Alemán Lacayo administration. Telcor handed over the frequency to Digital Media, forcing Canal 6 to stay without its relayer.

Programming 
As of November 2022:

Kids 
 Imported TV series mostly from the Disney and Studio 100 catalogs

TV series 
 Héroe Blindado
 Ultraman Tiga
 Criminología Naval
 Numbers
 Flashpoint
 Mentes Criminales
 NCIS: Los Ángeles
 CSI: Miami
 SAF3
 Águila Roja
 Bandolera
 Justicia Letal
 Tierra de Lobos
 Los Tudor

Sports 
 WWE Raw
 WWE SmackDown

Music 
 Top 9

Reality 
 Survivor
 Fear Factor
 Hombre al agua
 BattleBots
 Cámara loca
 Desafío Marruecos
 Desafío África

Religion 
 El Camino Antiguo

References

External links 
 

Television stations in Nicaragua
Television channels and stations established in 2011
Spanish-language television stations